Aleks Milenov Petkov (born 25 July 1999) is a Bulgarian footballer who plays as a defender for Arda Kardzhali.

Career
Petkov began his career at Cherno More Varna and joined Heart of Midlothian at the age of 16 in June 2016, signing a three-year contract.

On 22 July 2017, Petkov made his first-team debut, replacing John Souttar during a 3–0 League Cup victory over East Fife at Tynecastle Park. On 19 January 2018, Petkov joined Scottish League Two side Berwick Rangers on loan until the end of the season. He made his league debut in a 2–3 home loss against Peterhead eleven days later, playing the full 90 minutes.

During the 2019–20 season Petkov was loaned to Clyde and Brechin City.

On 8 September 2020, Petkov returned to Bulgaria, signing a 1-year deal with Levski Sofia.

International career
Petkov made his debut for the Bulgarian under-21 team on 22 March 2019 in the starting eleven for the friendly against Northern Ireland U21. He earned his first cap for the senior national team on 26 March 2022, coming on as a substitute during the second half in the 1:2 loss against Qatar in a friendly match.

Personal life
Petkov's father, Milen Petkov, was also a professional footballer and Bulgarian international.

References

External links

1999 births
Living people
Bulgarian footballers
Bulgaria youth international footballers
Heart of Midlothian F.C. players
Berwick Rangers F.C. players
Clyde F.C. players
Brechin City F.C. players
PFC Levski Sofia players
FC Arda Kardzhali players
Scottish Professional Football League players
Association football central defenders
Association football midfielders